The masked mountain tanager (Tephrophilus wetmorei) is a vulnerable species of bird in the tanager family Thraupidae. It is the only member of the genus Tephrophilus. This large and colourful tanager is endemic to elfin forest, woodland and shrub in the Andean highlands of southern Colombia, Ecuador and northern Peru. It is generally rare or uncommon, and is threatened by habitat loss.

Taxonomy
The masked mountain tanager was formally described in 1934 by the American ornithologist Robert Thomas Moore from a specimen collected at the base of the Sangay volcano in Ecuador. He introduced a new monospecific genus Tephrophilus to give the binomial name Tephrophilus wetmorei. The generic name combines the Ancient Greek tephra meaning "ashes" (i.e. volcano) and philos meaning "-loving". The specific epithet was chosen to honour the ornithologist Alexander Wetmore. The species was subsequently placed in the genus Buthraupis but when a molecular phylogenetic study published in 2014 found Buthraupis was polyphyletic, the masked mountain tanager was returned to the resurrected genus Tephrophilus. The species is monotypic: no subspecies are recognised.

References

External links
 Xeno-canto: audio recordings of the masked mountain tanager

masked mountain tanager
Birds of the Ecuadorian Andes
masked mountain tanager
Taxonomy articles created by Polbot